Television Event is an 2020 American-Australian documentary film, directed and produced by Jeff Daniels. It follows the making and release of The Day After, a film directed by Nicholas Meyer, which revolved around a nuclear war and was controversial upon release.

It had its world premiere at DOC NYC on November 11, 2020.

Synopsis
The film follows the production and making of The Day After, a film directed by Nicholas Meyer, which revolved around a nuclear war and received controversy upon release. Appearing were Meyer, Edward Hume, Stephanie Austin, Ellen Anthony, Ted Koppel, Stu Samuels, Robert Papazian, Walton Dornisch, David Longhurst, and Mark Weinberg, while Brandon Stoddard appears through archive footage.

Release
Television Event had its world premiere at DOC NYC on November 11, 2020. In May 2021, the film went on to screen at the RiverRun International Film Festival, where Jeff Daniels received the award for Best Feature Documentary Director. The film screened at the Full Frame Documentary Film Festival on June 2, 2021. It also screened at the Tribeca Film Festival on June 13, 2021, after it was previously set to make its world premiere at the festival in April 2020, prior to its cancellation due to the COVID-19 pandemic. The Nantucket Film Festival also announced Television Event's selection as part of its lineup for June 2021.

Critical reception
Television Event received positive reviews from film critics. On Rotten Tomatoes it has a 92% approval rating, based reviews from 12 critics, with an average rating of 7.90 out of 10.

Awards

|-
| 2022
| Television Event
| Uranium International Film Festival Best Feature Documentary
| 
|-
| 2021
| Television Event
| Cinema for Peace Foundation Award for Most Valuable Documentary
| 
|-
| 2021
| Television Event
| Atom Award for Best History Documentary
| 
|-
| 2021
| Television Event
| Hot Springs Documentary Film Festival Award for Best Documentary Feature
|  
|-
| 2021
| Television Event
| Sydney Film Festival Award for Best Australian Documentary 
| 
|-
|2021
| Television Event
| Philadelphia Film Festival Award for Best Feature Documentary 
| 
|- 
|2021
| Television Event
| Newport Beach Film Festival Award for Best Feature Documentary 
| 
|-
| 2021
| Television Event
| Footcandle Film Festival Audience Favourite Feature Award
| 
|-
| 2021
| Television Event
| Sidewalk Film Festival Programmers' Feature Film Award
| 
|-
| 2021
| Television Event
| RiverRun Film Festival Award for Best Director of a Documentary Feature
| 
|-
| 2021
| Television Event
| Full Frame Center for Documentary Filmmakers Award 
|

References

External links
 
 

2020 films
2020 documentary films
American documentary films
Australian documentary films
Documentary films about films
2020s English-language films
2020s American films